Louis Botha (27 September 1862 – 27 August 1919) was a South African politician who was the first prime minister of the Union of South Africa – the forerunner of the modern South African state. A Boer war hero during the Second Boer War, he eventually fought to have South Africa become a British Dominion.

Early life 
Louis Botha was born in Greytown, Natal one of seven sons and eight daughters born to Louis Botha Senior (Somerset East, Eastern Cape, 26 March 1827 – Harrismith, Orange Free State, 5 July 1883) and Salomina Adriana van Rooyen (Somerset East, 31 March 1829 – Harrismith, 9 January 1886). Louis Botha briefly attended the school at Hermannsburg before his family relocated to the Orange Free State. The name Louis runs throughout the family, with every generation since General Louis Botha having the eldest son named Louis. Botha had three brothers who also served as generals in the Second Boer War: an older brother Philip Rudolf (1851–1901), and two younger brothers, Chris (1864–1902), a police officer, and Theunis Jacobus Botha (1867–1930).

Zulu conflict 
Louis Botha led "Dinuzulu's Volunteers", a group of Boers that had supported Dinuzulu against Zibhebhu in 1884.

Politician 
Botha later became a member of the parliament of Transvaal in 1897, representing the district of Vryheid.

Second Boer War

Early battles 
In 1899, Louis Botha fought in the Second Boer War, initially joining the Krugersdorp Commando, continuing to fight under Lucas Meyer in Northern Natal, and later as a general commanding and leading Boer forces impressively at Colenso and Spion Kop. On the death of P. J. Joubert, he was made commander-in-chief of the Transvaal Boers, where he demonstrated his abilities again at Belfast-Dalmanutha. After one of the battles at the Tugela River, Botha granted a twenty-four-hour armistice to General Buller to enable him to bury his dead.

Capture of Winston Churchill 
Winston Churchill revealed that General Botha was the man who captured him at the ambush of a British armoured train on 15 November 1899.  also claims that Botha captured Churchill at train ambush 15 November 1899. Churchill was not aware of the man's identity until 1902, when Botha travelled to London seeking loans to assist his country's reconstruction, and the two met at a private luncheon. The incident is also mentioned in Arthur Conan Doyle's book, The Great Boer War, published in 1902. However more recent sources claim that Field cornet Sarel Oosthuizen was in fact the Boer soldier who, at gunpoint, captured Churchill. Another version claims that the unit to capture Churchill was the Italian Volunteer Legion and its commander, Camillo Ricchiardi.

Later campaigns 
After the fall of Pretoria in June 1900, Louis Botha led a concentrated guerrilla campaign against the British together with Koos de la Rey and Christiaan de Wet. The success of his measures was seen in the steady resistance offered by the Boers to the very close of the three-year war.

Role after the Boer War 

Botha was prominent in efforts to achieve a peace with the British, representing the Boers at the peace negotiations in 1902, and was signatory to the Treaty of Vereeniging. In the period of reconstruction under British rule, Botha went to Europe with de Wet and de la Rey to raise funds to enable the Boers to resume their former avocations. Botha, who was still looked upon as the leader of the Boer people, took a prominent part in politics, advocating always measures which he considered as tending to the maintenance of peace and good order and the re-establishment of prosperity in the Transvaal. His war record made him prominent in the politics of Transvaal and he was a major player in the postwar reconstruction of that country, founding with Jan Smuts the Het Volk Party in the Transvaal Colony in 1904, which served as a springboard to campaign for responsible self-government for the colony.

After the grant of self-government to the Transvaal on 6 December 1906 and the success of his Het Volk Party at the first elections in February 1907, Botha was called upon by Lord Selborne to form a government as Prime Minister on 4 March 1907, and in the spring of the same year he took part in the conference of colonial premiers held in London. During his visit to England on this occasion General Botha declared the wholehearted adhesion of the Transvaal to the British Empire, and his intention to work for the welfare of the country regardless of racial differences. The following year Botha participated in the National Convention (South Africa) which opened up the way for the passage of the South Africa Act of 1909 by the British parliament which in turn allowed for the formation of the Union of South Africa.

When South Africa obtained dominion status in 1910, Botha became the first Prime Minister of the Union of South Africa. In 1911, together with another Boer war hero, Jan Smuts, he formed the South African Party, or SAP. Widely viewed as too conciliatory with Britain, Botha faced revolts from within his own party and opposition from James Barry Munnik Hertzog's National Party. He was a South African Freemason.

Later career 
After the First World War started, he sent troops to take German South-West Africa, a move unpopular among Boers, which provoked the Boer Revolt.

Praise for the British 

At Versailles on 1 June 1919, 17 years after the signing of the Treaty of Vereeniging, General Botha, now a member of the British Empire Delegation, put his hand on Lord Milner's shoulder, and said "Seventeen years ago my friend and I made peace at Vereeniging – it was a bitter peace for us, bitter hard.  We lost all for which we had fought – our independence, our flag, our country.  But we turned our thoughts and efforts then to saving our people; and they, the victors, helped us.  It was a hard peace for us to accept, but as I know it now, when time has shown us the truth, it was not unjust – it was a generous peace that the British people made with us, and that is why we stand with them today side by side in the cause which has brought us all together."

At the end of the War he briefly led a British Military Mission to Poland during the Polish–Soviet War. He argued that the terms of the Versailles Treaty were too harsh on the Central Powers, but signed the treaty. Botha was unwell for most of 1919. He was plagued by fatigue and ill health that arose from his robust waistline.

Death 

General Louis Botha died of heart failure at his home following an attack of Spanish influenza on 27 August 1919 in the early hours of the morning. He was 56. His wife Annie was at home and was joined by Engelenburg who had acted as a private secretary to Botha. Botha was laid to rest in the Heroes' Acre of the Church Street Cemetery in Pretoria.

Of Botha, Winston Churchill wrote in Great Contemporaries "The three most famous generals I have known in my life won no great battles over a foreign foe. Yet their names, which all begin with a 'B', are household words. They are General Booth, General Botha and General Baden-Powell...."

Honours 
Sculptor Raffaello Romanelli won the competition to create the equestrian statue of Botha that stands in front of the South African Parliament building but died before completing it. His son Romano Romanelli was contracted to finish his father's work.

Sculptor Anton van Wouw created a statue of Botha in Durban unveiled in 1921.

Sculptor Coert Steynberg was commissioned to create the equestrian statue of Botha in front of the Union Buildings in Pretoria. It was unveiled in 1946.

The General Botha Regiment of the South African Army is named after Botha.

References

Sources

Further reading

Biographical

Historical 
  (insights of Botha)
  (comprehensive commentaries on Smuts and Botha, or as William's titled them in the last chapter of this book par nobile fratrum

Fiction 
 (a heroic Boer character in this Australian/Boer War novel)

External links 

 
 Anne Samson: Botha, Louis, in: 1914-1918-online. International Encyclopedia of the First World War.

|-

|-

|-

|-

|-

|-

Prime Ministers of South Africa
Members of the House of Assembly (South Africa)
South African Republic generals
South African Republic military personnel of the Second Boer War
1862 births
1919 deaths
Afrikaner people
Boer generals
South African Party (Union of South Africa) politicians
South African people of World War I
Deaths from Spanish flu
Infectious disease deaths in South Africa
People from Greytown, KwaZulu-Natal
South African people of Dutch descent
1900s in the South African Republic
1900s in Transvaal
1910s in South Africa
20th-century South African people
South African members of the Privy Council of the United Kingdom
South African Freemasons